"We're the Kids" is the debut single from Californian electronic rock band Parade of Lights. The single was released on June 13, 2013 as the lead-off single for the band's second extended play, Golden, as well as their 2015 debut album Feeling Electric.

It was the first song by the band to chart, reaching #41 in the Billboard Hot Dance Club Songs.

Music video
The music video for "We're the Kids" was first released onto YouTube and Vevo on November 23, 2013. The video shows the band performing the song in a dark, abandoned house.

Commercial performance
 Billboard Hot Dance Club Songs: 41

References

2013 songs
2013 singles
Astralwerks singles